Adam Alexander Crozier (born 26 January 1964) is a Scottish businessman, and was formerly the chief executive officer of media company ITV plc, operator of the ITV television network covering most of the United Kingdom.

After a career at Saatchi & Saatchi culminating in the post of joint chief executive in 1995, he came to wide public prominence as the new chief executive of The Football Association in 2000 at the age of 35, before in 2003 becoming the chief executive of the Royal Mail Group, the United Kingdom's mail delivery service, where he oversaw a controversial modernisation and redundancy programme.

In January 2010 he was announced as the new chief executive of ITV plc, where he arrived on 26 April 2010. Crozier announced he was leaving this post in June 2017.

Crozier became the Chairman of BT Group Plc on the 1st December 2021.

Early life and education
Crozier was born and raised on the Isle of Bute on the west coast of Scotland in 1964. His father was a manager for Lord Bute, and his mother was secretary to the managing director of The Scotsman. Crozier went to a school in Ayr, before moving to Graeme High School, a comprehensive school in Falkirk. He graduated with a Bachelor of Arts degree (BA) in business organisation from Edinburgh's Heriot-Watt University. While at school, Crozier had trials with both Hibernian and Stirling Albion football clubs.

Crozier received an Honorary Doctorate from Heriot-Watt University in 2005.

Career

Early career
Crozier joined Pedigree Petfoods as a graduate trainee in 1984. In 1986, he moved to  The Daily Telegraph to work in media sales.

Saatchi & Saatchi
From 1988 to 1999 Crozier worked for advertising agency Saatchi and Saatchi, becoming media director in 1990, and then being appointed as joint chief executive from 1995 alongside Tamara Ingram. This occurred in the wake of the departure of the founding Saatchi brothers to form M&C Saatchi.

The Football Association
Crozier came to public attention as the surprise appointment to the role of chief executive of The Football Association, the governing body of England's national game, football, aged just 35 and having had no experience of business in football. He replaced Graham Kelly. In his short tenure from 2000 to 2002, the FA relocated headquarters from Lancaster Gate to Soho Square, appointed the first ever foreign England national team manager, Swede Sven-Göran Eriksson, and became a more commercial organisation, maximising its revenues. He also reduced the average age of the FA's staff from 55 to 32, progressed the Wembley Stadium redevelopment, and reduced the FA's ruling body from a 91-member FA Board to a committee of 12. His moves were not without criticism, with complaints from some about lack of consultation and of acting beyond his powers. He was replaced by Mark Palios.

While at the FA, Crozier reportedly identified some members of the England national team as the Golden Generation. It was a term later criticised towards the end of the decade by some England players as having been undeserved, and of causing undue expectations and pressure due to the fact they had at the time, and in years since, failed to win major tournaments.

Royal Mail

Crozier became the chief executive of the Royal Mail Group in February 2003. Entering the post, Crozier described his remit as the "biggest corporate turnaround programme in the UK". Crozier initiated a programme of modernisation and reform, to deal with changes in the service brought about by reforms beginning with the Postal Services Act 2000.

In Crozier's first three years, the Royal Mail division produced record annual profits of £537m in May 2005, making £2m a day in profits, up from £1.5m a day losses before he joined. The Group overall had been transformed from recording losses of £1.1bn at the start of the turnaround plan in 2002 into a profit of £355m in 2005. Royal Mail chairman Allan Leighton said it was a "fantastic turnaround" but also that there was still "a huge amount to do". The newly formed mail regulator Postwatch were however critical that it had failed to achieve 11 of its 15 licence targets during the previous financial year. As the postal service was opened up to competition in early 2006, Royal Mail recorded losses of £10m in 2006 and £279m in 2007.

His reforms included highly controversial large scale post office closures in the thousands, layoffs of Royal Mail staff, changes in working practices, and the ending of the second daily delivery and moving the first daily delivery to later in the day. While at the Royal Mail, Crozier's salary, one of the largest in the country for the head of a publicly owned body, was criticised in light of the changes being made to the Royal Mail workforce. Ongoing reforms eventually led to large scale industrial disputes and strike action in both 2007 and 2009 onwards.

Crozier was CEO of Royal Mail at crucial period in the Post Office Scandal when the Post Office was still part of Royal Mail, in which hundreds of sub-postmasters were falsely accused of, and prosecuted for, theft or false accounting. Prosecutions were conducted based on revenue shortfalls identified by the Post Office's Horizon computer system. These were erroneous and the result of bugs and errors in the system. Post Office officials knew about the bugs as early as 2002, but chose to continue with the prosecutions regardless.

ITV
On 28 January 2010, it was announced Adam Crozier would be leaving the Royal Mail later in 2010 to become the next permanent chief executive of media group ITV plc.

ITV plc is one of three partners within ITV Network Limited, the not for profit organisation which runs the ITV television network, the United Kingdom's first commercial network effectively created under the Television Act 1954. Crozier was replacing Michael Grade, who announced his intention to leave in April 2009. Crozier was given the task of increasing ITV's advertising revenues which had fallen with the proliferation of new channels in the British television market. On announcing the appointment, ITV chairman Archie Norman said of Crozier that he is a "very strong leader with a great track record in delivering transformational change".

Other roles
Crozier is also a board member of Camelot Group, the National Lottery operator, and the Debenhams retail chain, before it was liquidated. He is also member of the President's Committee of the Confederation of British Industry (CBI). He joined the board of Whitbread in 2017, becoming a senior independent director that year. In 2018 he succeeded the retiring Richard Baker as Whitbread's chairman.

Crozier was the chairman of Vue Cinemas from 2017 to 2020, and the chair of ASOS plc from 2018 to 2021.

In February 2020 Crozier was appointed non-executive chairman of Kantar Group.

In August 2021, it was announced that Crozier would take over as Chairman of BT, replacing Jan du Plessis in December that year.

Personal life
Crozier is married to Annette, whom he met while working for Saatchi and Saatchi, and has two children. Despite having taken on high-profile jobs involving pressing through major upheavals, he is described as "softly spoken" and has previously said of the spotlight, "I hate it, absolutely hate it. The bizarre thing about the last three jobs I've done is that I don't like [the public profile] at all. I will go to enormous lengths not to do public things – because it is just not me."

References

1964 births
Alumni of Heriot-Watt University
Chief executives of the Football Association
Living people
Royal Mail people
Scottish businesspeople
Scottish chief executives
Scottish television executives
People from the Isle of Bute
People educated at Graeme High School